Let My People Go! is a 2011 film directed by Mikael Buch. It premiered at the 2011 Montreal World Film Festival and was released in December 2011 in France. It was released in the United States in 2013 by Zeitgeist Films and grossed $18,529 domestically.

Synopsis
Ruben is a French-Jewish gay mailman is living in fairytale Finland (where he got his MA in "Comparative Sauna Cultures") with his gorgeous Nordic boyfriend. Just before Passover, a series of mishaps and a lovers' quarrel exile the heartbroken Reuben back to Paris and his zany family—including Carmen Maura as his ditzy mom, and Truffaut regular Jean-François Stévenin as his lothario father. Scripted by director Mikael Buch and renowned arthouse auteur Christophe Honoré, Let My People Go! both celebrates and upends Jewish and gay stereotypes.

Main cast
 Nicolas Maury as Ruben
 Carmen Maura as Rachel
 Jean-François Stévenin as Nathan
 Amira Casar as Irène
 Clément Sibony as Samuel
 Jarkko Niemi as Teemu
 Jean-Luc Bideau as Maurice
 Didier Flamand as André
 Kari Väänänen as Monsieur Tilikainen
 Olavi Uusivirta as Fredrik
 Aurore Clément as Françoise
 Michaël Abiteboul as Ézechiel
 Charlie Dupont as Hervé

Awards
 2012: Philadelphia QFest: Best Comedic Film 
 2012: Asheville QFest: Best Cinematography

Reception
"A fairy-tale romance whose title acknowledges both a saturation in and longing to be free of Jewish cultural baggage, Mikael Buch's Let My People Go!cross-breeds cultures that are rarely paired onscreen. International box-office prospects are fair in urban arthouses, where the presence of Almodóvar collaborator Carmen Maura may tip moviegoers off to the pop-inflected, comic semi-scandals in store."
-John DeFore, The Hollywood Reporter

References

External links
 
 
 

2011 films
2011 comedy films
Films shot in Paris
French comedy films
French LGBT-related films
2010s French-language films
2011 LGBT-related films
LGBT-related comedy films
2011 directorial debut films
Films about LGBT and Judaism
2010s French films